Hugh William Skinner (born 6 January 1985) is an English actor. He is best known for starring in sitcoms W1A (2014–2017) and The Windsors (2016–2020), and his appearances in musical films Les Misérables (2012) and Mamma Mia! Here We Go Again (2018).

Early life
Skinner grew up in London and Tunbridge Wells, and attended Eastbourne College from 1998 to 2003. He lived in Perth, Australia, for a year at age four. He graduated from the London Academy of Music and Dramatic Art in 2006.

Career

Early work (2007–2015) 
Skinner's first professional acting role was in the English Touring Theatre's 2007 production of French Without Tears. In addition to his work on stage, he played supporting roles in the BBC series Tess of the d'Urbervilles as Felix Clare in 2008, and Any Human Heart as Lionel in 2010. He also played the role of Joly, one of the student revolutionaries, in the 2012 film of Les Misérables.

In the autumn of 2013, Skinner played the role of Luis Carruthers, a closeted gay man who is in love with the show's protagonist, Patrick Bateman, in the world premiere of American Psycho at the Almeida Theatre. He also appeared on the London cast album, which was released in 2016. While performing in American Psycho, he began filming the first series of the comedy W1A, playing the role of Will Humphries, an inept yet endearing intern at the BBC. The first series was released in 2014, with subsequent series airing on BBC2 in 2015 and 2017.

Skinner played the role of Dr. Barnaby Ford in the BBC series Our Zoo. He also appeared at the Theatre Royal, Bath as Camille in Helen Edmundson's adaptation of Thérèse Raquin, and as Yepikhodov in Simon Stephens' new translation of The Cherry Orchard at the Young Vic. He returned to the Young Vic in the summer of 2015 to play dual roles in Nick Gill's adaptation of The Trial. In the autumn of 2015, it was announced that he had been cast as Unwin Trevaunance, an aspiring Member of Parliament, in the second series of the BBC production of Poldark, which aired in 2016.

Breakthrough (2016–present) 
Skinner starred in The Windsors, a spoof of the British royal family, as Prince William which aired on Channel 4 in 2016. The same year, he had a role in Fleabag, a BBC3 and Amazon production, where he played the protagonist's hapless boyfriend Harry. The following year, he played Sir George Howard in the first series of Harlots, an 18th-century costume drama that premiered on ITV Encore and Hulu in March. Also in 2017, he played a supporting role in Hampstead opposite Diane Keaton and Brendan Gleeson, and appeared in Star Wars: The Last Jedi.

Skinner co-starred in Mamma Mia! Here We Go Again, the 2018 sequel to the 2008 film Mamma Mia!, in which he played Young Harry, a version of the character originated by Colin Firth in the first film. In 2018 he also starred in the eighth and final episode of Matthew Weiner's anthology series The Romanoffs, playing the role of Simon Burrows.

He reprised his role as Harry in series 2 of Fleabag, which was released on BBC3 in March 2019 and was released on Amazon Prime in May 2019. On 5 April 2019, it was announced that Skinner had joined the cast of the period drama Little Birds, which premiered on Sky Atlantic in August 2020. In December 2019, it was announced that he would be co-starring in the film Falling for Figaro with Danielle Macdonald and Joanna Lumley. In September 2021, he featured in the Radiohead music video for the song 'If You Say The Word'.

Personal life 
Skinner is gay. Commenting on his sexuality in 2018 he stated: "I feel like if I talk about being gay I have to say something and I don’t know what to say other than that just is my life and I haven’t got anything very interesting to say about it. It just is".

Skinner is good friends with his American Psycho and W1A co-star Jonathan Bailey.

Acting credits

Film

Television

Theatre

References

External links
 

1985 births
Living people
21st-century English male actors
People from Royal Tunbridge Wells
People educated at Eastbourne College
Alumni of the London Academy of Music and Dramatic Art
English male film actors
English male stage actors
English male television actors
English male voice actors
English gay actors
Male actors from London
20th-century LGBT people
21st-century LGBT people
English LGBT actors